The Premio Tudini is a Group 3 flat horse race in Italy open to thoroughbreds aged three years or older. It is run at Capannelle over a distance of 1,200 metres (about 6 furlongs), and it is scheduled to take place each year in May.

The event was formerly known as the Premio Melton, and it held Group 3 status for a period in the 1970s. It was promoted to Group 2 level in 1979.

The Premio Melton was subtitled the Memorial Tudini during the 1990s. It was relegated back to Group 3 status in 1996. It was run as the Premio Tudini Piero e Ugo in the early 2000s, and it subsequently became the Premio Tudini.

The Premio Tudini is currently staged at the same meeting as the Derby Italiano.

Records
Most successful horse since 1975:
 Tres Gate – 1981, 1982
 St Paul House – 2004, 2005

Leading jockey since 1987 (4 wins):
 Michael Kinane – Ginny Binny (1987), Edy Bedy (1988), Beat of Drums (1996), St Paul House (2004)

Leading trainer since 1987 (2 wins):
 Roberto Brogi – Fred Bongusto (1994), Per Incanto (2007)
 Armando Renzoni – Armando Carpio (1997), Kuaicoss (2006)
 Riccardo Menichetti - Pleasure Place (2003), United Color (2012)
 Daniele Camuffo - St Paul House (2004), Victory Laurel (2013)
 Vincenzo Fazio - Omaticaya (2014), Plusquemavie (2016)

Winners since 1987

Earlier winners
 1975: Red Gift
 1976: Policrock
 1977: Madang
 1978: Dublin Taxi

 1979: Tanfirion
 1980: Northjet
 1981: Tres Gate
 1982: Tres Gate

 1983: Snatch and Run
 1984: Forzando
 1985: Gaius
 1986: Tinterosse

See also
 List of Italian flat horse races

References
 Racing Post:

 capannelleippodromo.it – Albo d'Oro – Premio Tudini.
 galopp-sieger.de – Premio Tudini (ex Premio Melton).
 horseracingintfed.com – International Federation of Horseracing Authorities – Premio Tudini (2016).
 pedigreequery.com – Premio Tudini – Roma Capannelle.

Horse races in Italy
Open sprint category horse races
Sports competitions in Rome